Alexandertorte, also known as Alexander Torte or Aleksander Torte (Aleksandra torte), is a dessert that was conceived to commemorate a visit of Tsar Alexander III in Riga, today's capital of Latvia.

Consisting of pastry strips filled with raspberry preserves or raspberry jam, it is traditionally eaten as a lunch or dinner dessert, but it can also be served at tea time. It should be made a day or so before it is planned to serve, because the icing must be hard before the torte is cut.

A similar dessert exists in Denmark, and is known as hindbærsnitte. In the German language area, a torte of the same name exists that has almonds and wineberries as the main ingredients.

A Finnish version of the dessert called  commemorates Tsar Alexander I of Russia and has been produced since 1818.

See also

 List of foods named after people
 List of pastries

References

External links
 

Pastries
Latvian cuisine
Danish cuisine
Finnish cuisine
Raspberry
Alexander III of Russia